Robert L. Wolke (April 2, 1928 – August 29, 2021) was an American chemist, professor emeritus of chemistry at the University of Pittsburgh. He was a food columnist for The Washington Post, and had written multiple books, which aim to explain everyday phenomena in non-technical terms:

What Einstein Didn't Know: Scientific Answers to Everyday Questions contains answers to everyday questions (e.g. "Why do car batteries go dead in winter?" and "Why does warm beer go flat?"), attempting to explain them scientifically but without using technical terms (though it often shows technical terms after their definitions). It also contains bar bets and "Try it" experiments related to the current subject.

What Einstein Told His Barber: More Scientific Answers to Everyday Questions is a nonfiction book written by Wolke. It is the sequel to What Einstein Didn't Know: Scientific Answers to Everyday Questions.

What Einstein Told His Cook: Kitchen Science Explained provides answers to common food science questions. The book also contains recipes by Wolke's wife, Marlene Parrish. Both the James Beard Foundation and International Association of Culinary Professionals have nominated this book as 2005's best technical or reference book.

What Einstein Told His Cook 2, The Sequel: Further Adventures in Kitchen Science is a nonfiction book and sequel to What Einstein Told His Cook: Kitchen Science Explained; this book provides answers to common questions related to kitchen science.

Awards
Wolke won awards such as the American Chemical Society's 2005 James T. Grady-James H. Stack Award for Interpreting Chemistry for the Public, International Association of Culinary Professionals' Bert Greene Award, and the James Beard Foundation's award for the best newspaper column.

Death
Wolke died on August 29, 2021, due to complications from Alzheimer's disease. He was 93.[2]

References

External links
 Official website

1928 births
2021 deaths
American food chemists
American food writers
American science writers
Scientists from Pittsburgh
James Beard Foundation Award winners
University of Pittsburgh faculty
Cornell University alumni
People from New York City
Neurological disease deaths in Pennsylvania
Deaths from Alzheimer's disease